The following are medications commonly prescribed cardiac pharmaceutical agents.
The specificity of the following medications is highly variable, and often are not particularly specific to a given class.
As such, they are listed as are commonly accepted.

 Antiarrhythmic agents
 Type I (sodium channel blockers)
 Type Ia
 Ajmaline
 Procainamide
 Quinidine
 Type Ib
 Lidocaine
 Phenytoin
 Type Ic
 Encainide
 Flecainide
 Propafenone
 Type II (beta blockers)
 Bisoprolol
 Carvedilol
 Metoprolol
 Propranolol
 Type III (potassium channel blockers)
 Amiodarone
 Dofetilide
 Sotalol
 Type IV (slow calcium channel blockers)
 Diltiazem
 Verapamil
 Type V
 Adenosine
 Digoxin
 ACE inhibitors
 Captopril
 Enalapril
 Perindopril
 Ramipril
 Angiotensin II receptor antagonists
 Candesartan
 Eprosartan
 Irbesartan
 Losartan
 Telmisartan
 Valsartan
 Beta blocker (see above)
 Calcium channel blocker (see above)
 Antimineralocorticoid
 Eplerenone
 Finerenone
 Spironolactone
 Antiplatelet drug
 Abciximab
 Aspirin
 Cangrelor
 Clopidogrel
 Eptifibatide
 Prasugrel
 Ticagrelor
 Tirofiban
 Anticoagulant
 Apixaban
 Bivalirudin
 Dabigatran
 Edoxaban
 Enoxaparin
 Heparin
 Rivaroxaban
 Warfarin
 Fibrinolytics
 Alteplase
 Streptokinase
 Urokinase
 Diuretics
 Bumetanide, furosemide, torsemide
 Hydrochlorothiazide

References

Cardiology